Garfield Vestal Cox (May 4, 1893 – February 9, 1970) was a leading authority on business fluctuations and forecasting.   He was one of the first people to study the performance of experts versus novices in forecasting stock prices.  He was also the Dean of the University of Chicago School of Business.

Early life
Cox was born in Fairmount, Indiana to Quaker parents Milton T. and Martha E. Cox and grew up on their farm.  He attended Earlham College for two years before transferring to Beloit College where he graduated in 1917.  While at Beloit, he was a member of the Dew Drop Inn club.  It was through the club that he met Warren C. Wade and his sister, Jeannette Wade, whom he eventually married.  The club eventually became a chapter of Sigma Pi fraternity and Cox was initiated into the fraternity as an alumnus.  In 1915 he attended a meeting in Indiana that led to the creation of the American Friends Service Committee.

After four years of outstanding performance in intercollegiate forensics, Cox was chosen to establish the Department of Public Speaking at Wabash College after his graduation.

When the United States entered World War I, Cox claimed an exemption from military service based on his Quaker beliefs.  He did volunteer to go to Western Front to serve as an aid worker for the American Friends Service Committee.  He departed from New York City on September 1, 1918 and returned on August 25, 1919.

Before leaving for France he married Jeannette.  They had three children, daughters Phyllis and Marilyn, and a son named Lowell.

University of Chicago
In 1920, Cox had become an instructor of Finance at the University of Chicago (U.C.).  He completed his Ph.D. at the university in 1929 and was promoted to professor in 1930.

He was named the Robert Law Professor of Finance in 1936.  In the 1942 he was named Acting Dean of the School of Finance, then Dean in 1945.

In 1947 he was given the honorary Doctorate of Laws degree from Beloit College.  He also received an honorary degree from Earlham College.

In 1952 Cox stepped down from his position as Dean.  He remained on the U.C. faculty until his retirement in 1958.

In 1930, Cox was one of the first researchers to compare the performance of experts versus novices in forecasting stock prices.  He found that expertise provided no advantage when compared to a minimal level of knowledge.  There was even evidence that showed additional expertise may actually decrease accuracy.

Cox was also one of the authors of the 1933 Chicago plan which called for banking reforms at the start of the Great Depression.

Other work
In 1935, Cox co-founded and became chairman of the board of South East National Bank of Chicago.  He served on the board for twenty-four years.

He was a founder of the 57th Street Meeting of Friends in Chicago and served as its clerk for more than twenty years.

He was a lecturer at Chicago Theological Seminary.

Cox served as president of the American Finance Association in 1954.

He was a contributor to the Encyclopedia of the Social Sciences, American Economic Review, Journal of Political Economy, Journal of the American Statistical Association, Journal of Business, and other scholarly periodicals. He also served as an economic consultant to business firms, appeared as an expert before several state public-service commissions, and was a noted speaker.

He was a member of Phi Beta Kappa, Delta Sigma Rho, and Beta Gamma Sigma and was president of the University of Chicago Quadrangle Club and of the Chicago Chapter of the American Statistical Association.

Retirement
Cox retired from U.C. in 1958 and moved to California in 1959.  While there he taught at the Southern California School of Technology.  He died in Los Angeles in 1970.

Published work
Price Indexes in the United States – 1924
Forecasting Business Conditions – 1927, 13 editions with Charles O. Hardy
An Appraisal of American Business Forecasts – 1929, 9 editions
The Relation of Stock Prices to Earnings – 1929
Business Forecasting in the United States:  1918-1928 - 1929
Inflation Burdens – 1935
The Economic Meaning of the Townsend Plan – 1936, 4 editions with Carl H. Chatters and John H. Cover
Is Socialism the Wave of the Future – 1946
Private Business and the Public Good – 1970, 2 editions
– Source:

References 

1893 births
1970 deaths
People from Grant County, Indiana
Beloit College alumni
Earlham College alumni
University of Chicago faculty
University of Chicago Booth School of Business faculty
American Quakers
Economists from Indiana
20th-century American economists
Presidents of the American Finance Association